Word Munchers is a 1985 video game and the first of the Munchers educational series. It was made by MECC for Apple II, then ported to DOS and Macintosh in 1991. It was re-released in 1996 for Windows and Macintosh as "Word Munchers Deluxe". The concept of the game was designed by Philip R. Bouchard, who also designed The Oregon Trail.

Gameplay
The player controls the Muncher who must move around a grid eating words that match condition at the top of the screen, while avoiding the threatening Troggles. As the player progresses through the levels, the difficulty of the matching conditions increases, and multiple Troggles pursue the Muncher.

Educational goals
The game was designed for first- to fifth-grade students, emphasizing vowel sounds, while teaching students grammar, phonics and reading skills in addition to introducing new words.

Reception

References

External links
 Official website
 

1985 video games
Apple II games
Children's educational video games
DOS games
Classic Mac OS games
Mathematical education video games
Single-player video games
Video games developed in the United States
Word puzzle video games